

Prefectures of Japan ranked by area as of 2022
Figures here are according to the official estimates of Japan. Ranks are given by estimated areas. Undetermined areas here account for domestic boundary regions either in uncertainty or disputed among Japanese prefectures.

Prefectures of Japan ranked by area as of January 1, 1883
Areas were calculated based on maps drawn by Inō Tadataka. Ranks are given by estimated areas.

See also 
 List of Japanese prefectures by GDP
 List of Japanese prefectures by population
 ISO 3166-2 codes for Japan
 Government of Japan
 Prefectures of Japan

External links
 Geographical Survey Institute of Japan
 Statistics Bureau of Japan

References and notes

 Area
Area
Japan, area